This article lists political parties in Gabon. 
Gabon is a one party dominant state with the Gabonese Democratic Party in power. Opposition parties are allowed, but are widely considered to have no real chance of gaining power.

The parties

Parliamentary parties

Other parties
African Development Movement (Mouvement Africain de Développement)
Common Movement for Development (Mouvement Commun pour le Développement)
African Forum for Reconstruction (Forum Africain pour la Réconstruction)
Democratic and Republican Alliance (Alliance Démocratique et Républicaine)
Gabonese Progress Party (Parti gabonais du progrès)
Gabonese Socialist Party (Parti Socialiste Gabonais)
Gabonese Union for Democracy and Development (Union Gabonaise pour la Démocratie et le Développement)
Jeunesse Gabonais, the first political party in Gabonese history
Movement for National Rectification (Mouvement de Redressement National)
National Woodcutters Rally-Kombila (Rassemblement National des Bûcherons – KOMBILA)
National Woodcutters' Rally – Rally for Gabon (Rassemblement national des bûcherons – Rassemblement pour le Gabon)
Rally of Democrats (Rassemblement des Démocrates)
Union of the Gabonese People (Union du Peuple Gabonais)

See also

 List of political parties by country

Gabon
 
Gabon
Political parties
Parties